Ivan Alexander Point (‘Nos Ivan Aleksandar’ \'nos i-'van a-lek-'san-d&r\) is the low rocky point on the southeast coast of Nelson Island in the South Shetland Islands, Antarctica forming the east side of the entrance to Bononia Cove and the west side of the entrance to Tuida Cove.

The point is named after Czar Ivan Alexander of Bulgaria, 1331–1371.

Location
British mapping in 1968.

Maps
 South Shetland Islands. Scale 1:200000 topographic map No. 3373. DOS 610 - W 62 58. Tolworth, UK, 1968.
 Antarctic Digital Database (ADD). Scale 1:250000 topographic map of Antarctica. Scientific Committee on Antarctic Research (SCAR), 1993–2016.

References
 Ivan Alexander Point. SCAR Composite Gazetteer of Antarctica.
 Bulgarian Antarctic Gazetteer. Antarctic Place-names Commission. (details in Bulgarian, basic data in English)

External links
 Ivan Alexander Point. Adjusted Copernix satellite image

Headlands of the South Shetland Islands
Bulgaria and the Antarctic